East Coast is a New Zealand parliamentary electorate, returning one Member of Parliament to the New Zealand House of Representatives. The electorate first existed from 1871 to 1893, and was recreated in 1999. The current MP for East Coast is Kiri Allan of the Labour Party, who has held office since 2020.

Population centres
The electorate's main centres are Gisborne (32,529) and Tolaga Bay in the Gisborne Region; and Opotiki and Whakatane (18,800) in the eastern part of the Bay of Plenty Region. Wairoa, the northernmost town in the Hawke's Bay region, was excluded by the 2007 boundary changes.

History
The East Coast electorate was first established for the 5th Parliament in 1871. William Kelly was the first elected representative; he held the seat until the end of the term in 1875.

The "most sensational electoral contest ever held in the East Coast" electorate was held in January 1876, when mysterious pieces of cardboard were distributed by supporters of George Read in Gisborne, which hotel bars accepted as legal tender. Read, George Morris and Kelly received 215, 206 and 185 votes, with another candidate coming a distant fourth. Morris petitioned against Read's election. A parliamentary committee of enquiry determined that Read had not broken any laws by approving the initiative, but the House of Representatives resolved that Read was to be unseated in favour of Morris, which happened later in 1876. This was the last election enquiry held by a parliamentary committee. Subsequently, these enquiries were held by the courts.

At the next election in 1879, Morris was defeated by Allan McDonald, who held the electorate until he resigned in 1884.

Samuel Locke won the resulting by-election and was confirmed a few months later at the 1884 general election. He served until the end of the term of the 9th Parliament in 1887.

William Lee Rees stood unsuccessfully in this and subsequent by-elections and elections.

Andrew Graham won the 1887 general election. He resigned in 1889 before the end of the term. Alexander Creighton Arthur won the resulting 1889 by-election. Arthur and Kelly (the electorate's first representative in 1871) contested the 1890 general election, and Kelly was successful by a small margin, with 1022 to 1008 votes in his favour. He served until the end of the term in 1893, after which the electorate was abolished, and was replaced by the Bay of Plenty and Waiapu electorates.

Members of Parliament
From 1871 to 1893, the electorate was represented by seven Members of Parliament.
Since 1999 it has been represented by two MPs.

Key

     

1 See History section above.

List MPs
The following table lists Members of Parliament elected from party lists in elections where that person also unsuccessfully contested the East Coast electorate. Unless otherwise stated, all MPs terms began and ended at general elections.

Election results

2020 election

2017 election

2014 election

2011 election

Electorate (as at 21 October 2011): 40,533

2008 election

2005 election

2002 election

1999 election

1890 election

1889 by-election

1887 election

1884 by-election

1881 election

Table footnotes

Notes

References

External links
Electorate Profile  Parliamentary Library

New Zealand electorates
1870 establishments in New Zealand
1893 disestablishments in New Zealand
1999 establishments in New Zealand
Politics of the Gisborne District
Politics of the Bay of Plenty Region